Oru Oodhappu Kan Simittugiradhu is a 1976 Indian Tamil language film directed by S. P. Muthuraman. The film stars Kamal Haasan and Sujatha. It is based on the novel of the same name written by Pushpa Thangadorai. The film was released on 4 June 1976.

Plot 
Ravi lives next door to Radha and both fall in love with each other. Ravi's friend challenges him that he can make Radha fall for him in one week. Unable to prove himself right, the friend attempts to molest Radha. Ravi arrives at the scene and a fight ensues with Ravi killing his friend unintentionally. Ravi is sentenced to life sentence and he requests Radha to forget him and carry on with her life.

Due to Gandhi's birthday, Ravi gets a pardon after spending six years in prison. Film begins with Ravi travelling back to his hometown. Ravi happens to meet Radha who in turn spurns him and asks him not to interfere with her life!
Apparently Radha is already married to Vijayakumar!

Unable to forget her, Ravi lives a lonely and monotonous life. Radha enters hs workplace and pleads with him to forget her and start his life anew. Ravi says that it is impossible unless Radha spends one whole day with him like as if they were married! "Don't mistake me," he pleads, "I will not even touch you." He explains that he had built a lot of dreams on living together and this "one day" business will satisfy his "hunger.”

Now Radha is overcome with emotions and is unable to forget Ravi!!!
She now requests that there is only one solution.........!

Radha requests Ravi to come over to her house and pick her up that very night. Together they will run away and live together Ravi turns up Radha writes a long letter for her husband and then leaves the house. What happens then forms the story.

Cast 
 Kamal Haasan as Ravi
 Sujatha as Radha
 Vijayakumar as Sundaram
 Vijayalakshmi as Swapna
 Vijayageetha as Meena
 Thilak
 A. K. Veerasami as Ravi's father
 Desigan as Train passenger

Production 
Oru Oodhappu Kan Simittugiradhu is based on the novel of the same name by Pushpa Thangadorai that was serialised in Dinamani Kathir. It was the debut film of producer S. Sankaran. Babu was the cinematographer of this film. The song "Aandavan Illa Ulagamithu" was shot on the Backwater near Pondicherry.

Soundtrack 
The soundtrack was composed by V. Dakshinamoorthy, while the lyrics for the songs were written by Kannadasan, Kumaradevan and R. Palani Samy. The song "Nalla Manam" is set in the Carnatic raga known as Kalyanavasantam.

Reception 
Kanthan of Kalki in his review praised the performances of star cast and Muthuraman's direction and concluded saying innovation of the film is not limited to the title. At the Filmfare Awards South, Muthuraman won in the Best Director – Tamil category, and Kamal in Best Actor – Tamil.

References

External links 
 

1970s Tamil-language films
1976 films
Films based on Indian novels
Films directed by S. P. Muthuraman
Films scored by V. Dakshinamoorthy